Major-General Sir Marie-Joseph-Eugène Fiset,  (March 15, 1874 – June 8, 1951) was a Canadian physician, military officer, Deputy Minister of Militia and Defence, Member of Parliament, the 18th Lieutenant Governor of Quebec, and the 3rd Canadian Surgeon General.

Early life
Born in Rimouski, Quebec, the son of Jean-Baptiste Romuald Fiset and Aimee Plamondon, Fiset was educated at Rimouski College and received a Bachelor of Arts degree and M.D. from Laval University.

Military career
He joined the 89th Temiscouata and Rimouski Battalion of Infantry at the age of 16. His military career continued during his studies, he was promoted to the rank of lieutenant while a student. In 1899 he succeeded his father as surgeon to the 89th Battalion but, a few months later, joined the Second (Special Service) Battalion of The Royal Canadian Regiment with the rank of major and saw service in the South African War. For his service in the war, he was appointed a Companion of the Distinguished Service Order (DSO) in the October 1902 South African Honours list.

With the end of his tour of duty in South Africa in 1900, Fiset interned at the Nose and Throat Hospital in London and L'Hôpital Saint-Antoine in Paris.

After a year he returned to Rimouski before becoming an adjutant in the Royal Canadian Army Medical Corps. In 1902 he was part of the Canadian Coronation Contingent for King Edward VII's coronation and traveled to the United Kingdom as the Surgeon-Lieutenant of The Royal Canadian Regiment. In 1903 he was promoted to the rank of colonel and became Director-General of the service.

Fiset was promoted to the rank of Surgeon General (Major General) at the beginning of World War I. He was knighted for his service in the war while the French government named him a Commandeur of the Legion of Honour.

Political career
He retired in 1923 and began a political career sitting in the House of Commons of Canada as the Liberal MP for Rimouski from 1924 until 1939. He served as Deputy Minister of Militia and Defence.

On December 30, 1939, Fiset became lieutenant governor of Quebec. On two occasions during the war he opened the legislative assembly wearing his major general's uniform in order to express support for the war effort. He remained in office until October 1, 1950.

See also 
Université Laval

References

External links
 

1874 births
1951 deaths
Canadian Knights Commander of the Order of St Michael and St George
Canadian military personnel of the Second Boer War
Canadian military personnel of World War I
Chevaliers of the Légion d'honneur
Liberal Party of Canada MPs
Lieutenant Governors of Quebec
Members of the House of Commons of Canada from Quebec
Surgeons General of Canada
Université Laval alumni
Canadian Militia officers